Henry White was a Scottish footballer who played in the Football League for Sheffield United.

References

Date of birth unknown
Date of death unknown
Scottish footballers
English Football League players
Association football forwards
Hibernian F.C. players
Hamilton Academical F.C. players
Sheffield United F.C. players